Cavubati is a surname. Notable people with the surname include:

Bill Cavubati (born 1970), Fijian rugby union player
Tevita Cavubati (born 1987), Fijian rugby union player
Viliame Cavubati (born 1945), Fijian politician

Fijian-language surnames